Transport theory may refer to:

Linear transport theory, the study of equations describing the migration of particles or energy within a host medium when such migration involves random absorption, emission and scattering events
Light transport theory, deals with the mathematics behind calculating the energy transfers between media that affect visibility
Transportation theory (mathematics), a name given to the study of optimal transportation and allocation of resources
Transport theory (statistical physics), concerns the exchange of mass, energy, charge, momentum and angular momentum between observed and studied systems
Transportation theory (psychology) (the immersion of individuals within narrative content)